The Last Tuesday Society is a London-based organization founded by William James at Harvard and run by artist Viktor Wynd with directors Allison Crawbuck and Rhys Everett, putting on absinthe tastings, literary and artistic events monthly.

Today, The Last Tuesday Society is active in many fields, from expeditions to Papua New Guinea, lectures, seances, a taxidermy academy, curiosity museum and home to London's most curious cocktail bar serving traditional absinthes in the true Belle Époque fashion.

The Last Tuesday Society's Absinthe Parlour was crowned the Best Bar in London at the 7th annual Design My Night Awards.

The Society has put on a large array of parties, including Halloween Balls, Wyndstock, a festival at Houghton Hall in Norfolk, The Animal Party, From The Beast To The Blond – a Fairy Tale Masked Ball with Marina Warner The Orphanage Masked Ball, a Danse Macabre and 'Loss; an Evening of Exquisite Misery' and modern day version of Gunter Grass's Fictional onion cellar nightclub from The Tin Drum where guests dress in decaying beauty, chop onions and cry.

Viktor Wynd's Little Shop of Horrors was located in Mare Street Hackney and dealt in taxidermy, shrunken heads and all things odd.

Viktor Wynd Fine Art was a commercial gallery where over 50 shows were curated including on Mervyn Peake Tessa Farmer Leonora Carrington and Stephen Tennant

In 2014 the shop and art gallery were converted into The Viktor Wynd Museum of Curiosities, Fine Art & Natural History and a  bar following a kickstarter campaign The Society has a long association with Devil's Botany Absinthe who have sponsored guided tours, lectures, tarot readings and other special events at The Last Tuesday Society. Previous exhibitions include Alasdair Gray, Gunter Grass & Mervyn Peake.

The Society also has put on what it claims to be London's longest running lecture series with over 500 lectures in the last ten years.

Collectors, researchers and absintheurs Allison Crawbuck and Rhys Everett joined the Society's Cocktail Bar in 2016. Together, they have curated the UK's most extensive list of premium quality, traditional absinthes and curious cocktails to pair. Directors Allison Crawbuck and Rhys Everett also launched London's very first Absinthe Distillery, Devil's Botany, during the lockdowns. The Last Tuesday Society was voted the Best Bar in London by 180,000 public voters for the DMN Awards 2018/2019.

References

Clubs and societies in London